The Best of Oingo Boingo: Skeletons in the Closet is a compilation of songs by American new wave band Oingo Boingo. It features songs recorded during the band's tenure with I.R.S. Records/A&M Records, culled from the albums Only a Lad (1981), Nothing to Fear (1982) and Good for Your Soul (1983).

Background
Skeletons in the Closet was issued just a few months after the band had released Boingo Alive, a double album of "live in the studio" re-recordings of many songs from their back catalog. In a 1988 article for the Los Angeles Times, Oingo Boingo frontman Danny Elfman stated that Skeletons in the Closet was issued by their former label A&M to directly compete with Boingo Alive, adding, "they’re looking for a way to scrape up a few bucks on a dead account." However, A&M executive Tom Corson denied this claim, stating, "the band feels our release may harm sales of their album. We don’t see it that way at all. In fact, we're fans of the group—and we have no intention of trying to harm their career." Corson added that several songs were removed upon request of the band, and that Elfman declined an offer to write the album's liner notes.

Track listing

Notes
The "edited version" of "Private Life" on this album is the same one that appears on all CD and cassette versions of Nothing to Fear, as well as re-issues of the LP. Only the original pressings of the Nothing to Fear LP contained an extended mix of the song.

The album cover, designed by Los Angeles artist Mark Ryden, is notable for the fact that it is the very first professional piece of art done by Ryden.

Home video
A music video compilation was also released by A&M alongside the album.

References

Oingo Boingo compilation albums
Albums produced by Danny Elfman
Albums produced by Steve Bartek
1989 greatest hits albums
A&M Records compilation albums